Matthew Lewis Dixon (born 19 April 2000) is an English diver who represents Great Britain and specialises in the 10 metre platform event. He won a silver medal at the European Championships in the 10 m synchro platform with Noah Williams as well as two silvers at the Commonwealth Games.

Career

2012–13
At the 2012 British National Cup Matthew finished 12th in the 10 m platform. At the 2013 British Diving Championship he finished 10th in the 3 m springboard and 5th in the 10 m Platform preliminaries.

2014: Commonwealth Games
At the 2014 European Junior Championships he finished 15th in the 1 m Springboard, 8th in the 3 m Springboard and won Bronze on the platform. At the 2014 British National Cup he finished 8th in the 3 m springboard and 5th in the 10 m platform. At the 2014 British Diving Championship he won Gold in the 10 m platform. At the 2014 Commonwealth Games Matthew finished 9th in the 10 m platform.

2017
In 2017, Dixon partnered with Noah Williams in the men's synchronized 10 metre platform in the FINA Grand Prix event in held in Gatineau, Canada, and won a gold medal. At the European Juniors in Bergen, Norway, the duo also won a silver in the 10 metre platform synchro.  Dixon also won a gold in the group A platform, beating his diving partner Williams.

At the 2017 European Diving Championships, Williams and Dixon won their first senior international title, gaining a bronze in the 10 metre platform synchro.

2018–2019
At the 2018 British Diving Championships, Dixon reclaimed his 10m platform title, scoring 437.10 in the prelims and a new personal best of 494.30 in the final, beating Leeds' Matty Lee and London's Noah Williams. Dixon and Williams came 2nd in the 10m synchro.

At the 2018 Commonwealth Games in Australia, Dixon and Williams scored 399.99 points, winning the silver medal behind fellow GB divers Tom Daley and Daniel Goodfellow. He also won a silver medal in the 10m individual event with a final score of 449.55, losing out to Australian diver Domonic Bedggood, who came first with a score of 451.15.

At the World Junior Diving Championships in Kyiv, Dixon and Williams won the silver medal in the 10 metre platform synchro.

At the 2018 European Championships in Glasgow/Edinburgh, Dixon won a silver with Noah Williams in the Men's 10 m synchro platform.

At the 2019 European Diving Championships held in Kyiv, Dixon won a bronze in Men's 10m synchro with Williams.

Achievements

References

References and notes

 A  Preliminaries

External links

 
 
 
 
  (2014)
 
 
 Style '20 Happy 2020 PROJECT - NTT docomo 
 Style '20 マシュー選手　紹介ムービー - YouTube 

2000 births
Living people
British male divers
English male divers
Commonwealth Games medallists in diving
Commonwealth Games silver medallists for England
Divers at the 2014 Commonwealth Games
Divers at the 2018 Commonwealth Games
Divers at the 2022 Commonwealth Games
European Games competitors for Great Britain
Divers at the 2015 European Games
Sportspeople from Plymouth, Devon
21st-century British people
Medallists at the 2018 Commonwealth Games